Philadelphia Gay News (PGN) is an LGBT newspaper in the Philadelphia area. The publication was founded in 1976 by Mark Segal, who was inspired by activist Frank Kameny when they met in 1970. 

PGN is the oldest LGBT publication founded as a weekly in the United States and is the largest on the East Coast with 25,000 weekly readers. PGN is a member of the National Gay Newspaper Guild.

Mission
The mission of Philadelphia Gay News is to serve as a forum for LGBT community discussion, and to act as a platform for communicating LGBT issues with mainstream media. "My initial goal for PGN was to be the publication that informed our community," Segal said in an interview with Julia Klein. "It was very modest. Then as we went on, I began to realize how powerful a communications medium that connected our community together could be, and my goals changed. I wanted to do more."

History 

1976 - Mark Segal founds PGN on January 3 as a monthly publication.

1993 - Philadelphia Magazine bestows PGN publisher Mark Segal with "Best of Philadelphia" award for "Clout".

2016 - Hillary Clinton writes an op-ed for PGN, which is the first time a major-party presidential candidate writes an op-ed for an LGBT newspaper.

2020 - In March, PGN is approved for a commemorative marker from the Pennsylvania Historical and Museum Commission. The sign will read: “First published in 1976, this early newspaper of the LGBTQ community was an outlet for intracommunication when few others were available. It served as a community-building vehicle at a time when the LGBTQ rights movement was still forming. At the outbreak of the HIV/AIDS epidemic, it became a lifesaving source for a community in need. It is now the most-awarded LGBTQ publication in the nation.”

Circulation 

The Philadelphia Gay News is distributed for free and can be picked up in vending boxes throughout Greater Philadelphia, Eastern Pennsylvania, Southern New Jersey and Delaware.

Vending Machines 
The Philadelphia Gay News received its batch of around 30 vending boxes in 1976. They were provided for free by the Philadelphia Evening Bulletin, who were retiring an old fleet. PGN’s longtime distribution manager, Don Pignolet, took them to  Earl Shibe Auto for painting. The shop was willing to donate paint for the boxes, but only one color: fresh plumb, or RAL-0007. 

“No one else had that color,” Pignolet said, “and it just seemed so gay.”

Pignolet and his father attached the coin mechanisms to the boxes, initially charging 50 cents an issue. Today the paper is free. Throughout the years the boxes have been used as trash cans and vandalized with stickers and graffiti. People have glued the boxes shut and scrawled homophobic graffiti on them, such as “Gay=Got AIDS Yet?” On several occasions, the boxes were blown up with homemade bombs consisting of M-80 fireworks.

References

External links 
Philadelphia Gay News Online

LGBT culture in Philadelphia
LGBT-related newspapers published in the United States
Newspapers published in Philadelphia
Publications established in 1976
1976 establishments in Pennsylvania